TestFreaks is a company with solutions for B2C retailers. The company is a product review aggregator, meaning that both expert/professional- and user reviews are aggregated from thousands of sources in many different languages using an advanced backend system.

Besides the aggregated reviews, TestFreaks also operates post-purchase customer review collection and moderation service in several different languages. 

The consumer website TestFreaks was a review site launched 2007 in several different languages. The website allowed users to read reviews and compare prices of a wide range of products. The consumer site was retired in March 2020. Since 2011, the company has gradually increased their solutions to suit e-commerce websites, retailers and manufacturers.

History
TestFreaks was launched in 2007 by the former Founders of PriceRunner, Kristofer Arwin, Magnus Wiberg, and Martin Alexanderson. Northzone, an investor in PriceRunner, who also invested in TestFreaks.

In 2011, TestFreaks launched a badge product allowing retailers to include product scores, pros and cons and review snippets directly onto their product and category listings pages. In a short time more than 100 retailers adopted the system which is also capable of collecting reviews from customers on the site and through post-purchase emails. 

In 2012, an API was launched to provide similar content which could sit alongside existing tabs. With the increasing interest from retailers, TestFreaks also started operating pro-active post-purchase review collection and moderation service. This creates unique content for a retailer which is fully indexed to give SEO value as well as increase conversion rate. Service reviews can also be collected to gather feedback about the customer experience.

In 2015, TestFreaks launched its Q&A module, which can be implemented using a simple script. This allows retailers to collect, answer and publish questions and answers as a way of increasing conversion rate and lower the bounce rate.

By 2017, TestFreaks has been successful in moving large retailers from industry leaders such as Bazaarvoice and Reevoo, saving them huge sums in monthly subscription fees, whilst providing a very similar service.

By 2020, TestFreaks has gained the trust of a large amount of retailers around the World, particularly in the Nordics, the Middle East and in Australia.

References

External links
Official B2B Website

Review websites
Comparison shopping websites
Consumer guides